The Trans-Andean railways provide rail transport over the Andes. Several are either planned, built, defunct, or waiting to be restored. They are listed here in order from north to south.

Colombian Railways 

 Feb 2011 - The Chinese Government plans to cooperate with Colombia in building a 220 km transcontinental railway which would link Colombia's Atlantic and Pacific coasts, according to a British newspaper.

Ecuador Trans-Andean Railway 
Much of Ecuador's Trans-Andean Railway (a railway network that once ran from Guayaquil to Quito) has been rendered useless by natural disasters. Torrential rains from the 1982–83 and 1997-98 El Niño caused massive landslides that damaged the railway line. The network is operated by Empresa de Ferrocarriles Ecuatorianos. Only three sections remain operational: a  segment connecting Quito and Cotopaxi National Park, a  stretch between Ibarra and Primer Paso, and the mountainous five-hour,  excursion from Riobamba to Sibambe.

Peru 

Although wholly within Peru, the Ferrocarril Central Andino (FCCA; the former Ferrocarril Central del Perú) running inland from Callao and Lima crosses the Andes watershed at Galera en route to La Oroya and Huancayo. From here the route is extended by the Ferrocarril Huancayo - Huancavelica. There was also a proposal for a  tunnel under the Andes.

The Ferrocarriles del Sur del Perú (FCS), now operated by PeruRail, runs from the coast at Matarani to Cuzco, and to Puno on Lake Titicaca from where steamers and train ferries have been run connecting with Guaqui in Bolivia.

Proposed Bolivia-Chile Trans-Andean railway 
Empresa Nacional de Ferrocarriles - ENFE, operator of the National Railways of Bolivia, and consultant Hagler Bailly, United States, have signed a contract to undertake an economic feasibility study into the proposed $US 1 billion 338 km Aiquile–Santa Cruz Railway (IRJ July p6). The line would connect the Eastern Railway network with the Andean Railway network, and effectively create a new trans-Andean railway from Pacific Ocean ports in Chile to the port of Santos in Brazil.

Other Bolivia-Chile railways:
 Ferrocarril de Antofagasta a Bolivia
 Arica–La Paz railway, Arica, Chile–La Paz

Proposed Peru - Brazil Railway 

In 2014, proposals were advanced by ProInversión for the above railway.

 Ucayali - western Brazil
 Huánuco - Peru
 Pasco - Peru
 San Martin - Peru
 Amazonas - Brazil 
 Cajamarca - Peru
 Piura - Peru - near Pacific coast in north

Argentina - Chile 

 (from North)

Salta-Antofagasta railway 
The Huaytiquina railway is a single  gauge linking Salta, Argentina, to Antofagasta, Chile.

Transandine Railway 
The central Transandine Railway from Valparaíso, Chile, to Mendoza, Argentina is defunct, pending reconstruction. Thus there are two break-of-gauge stations, one at Los Andes, Chile and the other at Mendoza.

South Trans-Andean railway 
 from Lonquimay (Chile) to Zapala (Argentina) – construction abandoned.  line once again proposed in 2005 and work underway at Chilean end in 2005; first stage completed by early 2006. Possible break-of-gauge and rack railway.
 from Osorno, Chile to Bariloche – never built.

BiOceanio 
 (2010)
 Brazil - Paraguay - Argentina - Chile 
  Mejillones
  Antofagasta
  Paranaguá
  São Francisco do Sul

See also 
 Panama Canal Railway
 Railway stations in Peru
 Tren a las Nubes

References

External links
 Mercosur report on links - Argentine Ministry of Economy (doc format)

Railway lines in Argentina
Rail transport in Bolivia
Rail transport in Chile
Rail transport in Colombia
Rail transport in Ecuador
Rail transport in Peru
Rail transport in South America
International railway lines
Andes
Mountain railways